Steklov (Cyrillic: Стеклов) is a Russian last name. It may refer to:
Steklov (surname) 
 Steklov (crater), a lunar impact crater on the far side of the Moon
 Steklov Institute of Mathematics, part of the Russian Academy of Sciences
 The KGB's nickname for Norwegian Prime Minister Jens Stoltenberg